Moon is a surname. Notable people with the surname include:

People
Alan R. Moon (born 1951), British designer of board games
Angus Moon QC (born 1962), British barrister
Aliona Moon (born 1989), Moldovan singer
Ben Moon (disambiguation)
Moon Bin (born 1998), member of South Korean boy band ASTRO
Brendan Moon (born 1958), Australian rugby union player
Moon Byul-Yi (born 1992), member of South Korean girl band, rapper and songwriter Mamamoo
Moon Byung-Woo (born 1986), South Korean football player
Charles Moon, American politician
Moon Dae-Sung (born 1976), South Korean retired taekwondo athlete
Darvin Moon (1963-2020), American logger and amateur poker player
David Moon (disambiguation)
Dean Moon (1927–1987), American hot rod pioneer and founder of the Mooneyes brand of car accessories
Edwin Moon (1886–1920), British aviation pioneer and war hero
Elizabeth Moon (born 1945), American science fiction and fantasy author
Ellie Moon, Canadian actor and playwright
Eric Moon (born 1923), American librarian and editor
George Moon (1909–1981), British actor
George Washington Moon (1823–1909), British writer and critic
Moon Geun-young (born 1987), South Korean actress, commercial star, and model
Hartley Moon (1877–1946), U.S. Army officer, adjutant general of Alabama 
Ian Moon (born 1958), Australian architect 
Moon Jae-in (born 1953), President of South Korea
Jamario Moon (born 1980), American professional basketball player
Joel Moon (born 1988), Australian rugby league player
Joshua Moon (born 1992), American owner of Kiwi Farms message board
Keith Moon (1946–1978), drummer for rock band The Who
Kevin Moon (born 1987), Scottish footballer
Kevin Moon (singer) (born 1998), member of South Korean boy band The Boyz
Lorna Moon (1886–1930), American author and screenwriter
Lottie Moon (1840–1912), American Baptist missionary to China
Madeleine Moon (born 1950), British MP for Bridgend
Mick Moon (Rupert Vance "Mick" Moon, 1892–1986), Australian recipient of the Victoria Cross
Odas Moon (c.1892–1937), American aviation pioneer
Parker Thomas Moon (1892–1936), US educator and political scientist
Parry Moon (1898–1988), American electrical engineer
Paul Moon (born 1968), New Zealand historian
Peter Moon (disambiguation)
Philip Burton Moon (1907–1994), British nuclear physicist
Robert Charles Moon (1844–1914), English ophthalmologist
Rob Moon (1973), Australian Paralympic Swim Team 2008 Beijing Paralympics
Robert James Moon (1911–1989), American physicist, chemist and engineer
Ronald Moon (born 1940), Chief Justice of the Hawaii State Supreme Court
Ronald Moon (priest) (1932-2011), Australian Anglican priest
Rupert Moon (born 1968), Welsh rugby union player
Rupert Vance Moon: see Mick Moon
Sarah Moon (born 1941), French photographer
Sheri Moon (born 1970), American actress and fashion designer
Slim Moon (born 1967), American record producer and musician
Moon So-ri (born 1974), South Korean actress
Moon Sung-kil (born 1963), South Korean retired boxer 
Sun Myung Moon (1920–2012), Korean founder of the Unification Church
Moon Tae-il (born 1994), member of South Korean boy band NCT
Wally Moon (1930–2018), American major league baseball player
Warren Moon (born 1956), quarterback in US and Canadian football
Warren Moon (footballer) (born 1982), Australian soccer player
William Moon (1818–1894), English inventor of Moon type, a writing system for the blind
Moon Young-Hui (born 1983), South Korean field hockey player

Fictional characters
Ally Moon (née Dawson), main character of Austin and Ally
April Moon, was the wife of a doctor who spealizes in prosphetic limbs in a Batman Beyond episode that bears her name
Austin Moon, from the Disney sitcom Austin & Ally
 Buster Moon, one of the main characters from the film Sing
Cindy Moon, also known as Silk, Korean-American superheroine from Marvel Comics
Colonel Tan-Sun Moon and General Moon, main antagonists in Die Another Day
Daphne Moon, from the TV series Frasier
Doctor Moon, from the TV series Doctor Who episodes "Silence in the Library" and "Forest of the Dead"
Eli Moon, the Cardcaptors name for the Cardcaptor Sakura character Eriol Hiiragizawa, voiced by Bill Switzer
Fletcher Moon from the book and TV series Half Moon Investigations
Harvey Moon, from the TV series Shine On Harvey Moon
Herbert Moon, from the Western video games Red Dead Redemption and Red Dead Redemption 2
Howard Moon, one of the two lead characters from the comedy series The Mighty Boosh
John Vincent Moon, from short story by Jorge Luis Borges "The Form of the Sword"
Kim Moon, a character in the American sitcom It's Garry Shandling's Show
Martin Moone, protagonist of Moone Boy
Molly Moon (character), from the children's book series of the same name
Pandora Moon, from the British television series Skins
Ruby Moon, a supporting character from the manga and anime series Cardcaptor Sakura and Cardcaptor Sakura: Clear Card
Shadow Moon, main character of American Gods
Simon Moon, anarchist, from The Illuminatus! Trilogy
Tan-Sun Moon, an antagonist from the James Bond film Die Another DayZhalia Moon, from TV series Huntik: Secrets & SeekersEastEnders
Several characters from the TV series EastEnders'' have appeared since 2002.
Alfie Moon
Alfred Moon
Anthony Moon
Bert Moon
Craig Moon
Danny Moon
Eddie Moon
Ernie Moon
Jake Moon
Kat Moon
Liza Moon
Maxwell Moon
Michael Moon
Victoria "Nana" Moon
Roxy Moon
Scarlett Moon
Spencer Moon
Tommy Moon
Tyler Moon
William Moon (EastEnders)

See also
List of people with the Korean family name Moon
 Moon (Korean name)

English-language surnames